Peterhead Football Club are a football club based in Peterhead, Aberdeenshire, Scotland. They currently play in Scottish League One after being promoted in the 2018–19 season.

History
The club was founded in 1891. The club was a Highland League club for most of its history.

The club were granted league status in 2000 when the SPL was expanded to twelve clubs leaving two places to be filled; Elgin City joined them in the Third Division from the Highland League.

Jim McInally was appointed on 7 October 2011 following the sacking of John Sheran on 23 September 2011 after the side won one game in 17 matches.

On 20 January 2013, Peterhead hosted Rangers, a game watched by 4,855 spectators. This remains Balmoor's all-time record attendance, with approximately 400 more fans than the previous fixture.

On 18 April 2014, Peterhead clinched their first trophy as a Scottish Football League club by winning the Scottish League Two title, beating Clyde 2–0 at Broadwood Stadium.

On 14 November 2015, Peterhead reached their first cup final since leaving the Highland League, beating Queen's Park to reach the Scottish Challenge Cup final. The club were beaten 4–0 by Rangers at Hampden Park.

Ground

Rivals
Peterhead's traditional rivals are the Highland League team Fraserburgh; however, since their election to the Scottish Football League in 2000 this rivalry has waned; they now have a new rivalry with Elgin City.

Honours
Scottish League Two Champions: (2) 2013–14, 2018–19

Scottish Challenge Cup Runners-up: (1) 2015–16

Highland League Winners: (5) 1946–47, 1948–49, 1949–50, 1988–89, 1998–99

Highland League Cup Winners: (5) 1962–63, 1965–66, 1967–68, 1980–81, 1988–89

Scottish Qualifying Cup (North) Winners: (6) 1946–47, 1975–76, 1977–78, 1978–79, 1985–86, 1997–98

Aberdeenshire Cup Winners: (20) 1905–06, 1934–35, 1935–36, 1946–47, 1948–49, 1949–50, 1958–59, 1962–63, 1964–65, 1967–68, 1968–69, 1969–70, 1970–71, 1974–75, 1976–77, 1978–79, 1984–85, 1987–88, 1988–89, 1998–99

Aberdeenshire Shield Winners: (2) 1998–99, 2009–10

Scottish Week Challenge Cup Winners: (3) 2011, 2012, 2013

Club records
Biggest win: 17–0 v Fort William 1998

Biggest home defeat: 0–10 v Fraserburgh 1974

Biggest away defeat: 0–13 v Aberdeen (Scottish Cup in 1923–24)

Record home attendance (Recreation Park): 8,643 v Raith Rovers (Scottish Cup, 25 February 1987)

Record home attendance (Balmoor Stadium): 4,885 v Rangers (Third Division, 20 January 2013)

Players

First-team squad

On loan

Club officials

Coaching staff
Manager: David Robertson
Assistant Manager: Ian Esslemont
First Team Coach: Jimmy Lindsay
Coach: Jordon Brown
Goalkeeping Coach: Barry Thomson
Physiotherapist: Donal Gallagher

Board
Chairman: Rodger Morrison
Director: Leslie Hill
Director: Conrad Ritchie
Director: Charlie Watt
Youth and Community Liaison: Nat Porter

Managers

 Colin Grant (1976–1980)
 Dennis D'Arcy (1980–1981)
 Joe Harper (1981–1982)
 Dave Smith (1982–1983)
 Jim Hamilton (1983–1990)
 George Adams (1990–1991)
 Jim Guyan (1991–1993)
 Ian Wilson (1993–1994)
 David Watson (1994–1995)
 Ian Wilson (1995–1998)
 Ronnie Brown (1998–2000)
 Ian Wilson (2000–2004)
 Iain Stewart (2004–2006)
 Steve Paterson (2006–2008)
 Neale Cooper (2008–2011)
 John Sheran (2011)
 Jim McInally (2011–2022)

* Prior to Colin Grant's appointment the team was picked by committee.

References

External links
 Official website

 
Football clubs in Scotland
Former Highland Football League teams
Association football clubs established in 1891
Scottish Football League teams
1891 establishments in Scotland
Scottish Professional Football League teams